Disocactus speciosus, the sun cactus, is a species of flowering plant in the family Cactaceae. It is native to Mexico, Honduras and Guatemala, and has been introduced to the Canary Islands. As its synonym Heliocereus speciosus it has gained the Royal Horticultural Society's Award of Garden Merit.

Subtaxa
The following subspecies are accepted:
Disocactus speciosus subsp. blomianus (Kimnach) Ralf Bauer – Chiapas
Disocactus speciosus subsp. cinnabarinus (Eichlam ex Weing.) Ralf Bauer – southern Mexico, Honduras
Disocactus speciosus subsp. heterodoxus (Standl. & Steyerm.) M.Á.Cruz & S.Arias – Guatemala
Disocactus speciosus subsp. speciosus

References

speciosus
Flora of Northwestern Mexico
Flora of Northeastern Mexico
Flora of Central Mexico
Flora of Southwestern Mexico
Flora of Guatemala
Plants described in 1991
Taxa named by Antonio José Cavanilles